The Landmark Conference men's basketball tournament is the annual conference basketball championship tournament for the NCAA Division III Landmark Conference. The tournament has been held annually since 2008. It is a single-elimination tournament and seeding is based on regular season records.

The winner, declared conference champion, receives the Landmark's automatic bid to the NCAA Men's Division III Basketball Championship.

Results

Championship records

Elizabethtown and Goucher have not yet qualified for the Landmark tournament finals
 Schools highlighted in pink are former members of the Landmark Conference

References

NCAA Division III men's basketball conference tournaments
Basketball Tournament, Men's
Recurring sporting events established in 2008